From its opening in 1961 until its closing in 2010, Pittsburgh's Civic Arena (formerly located at 300 Auditorium Place and later 66 Mario Lemieux Place), has hosted many local, regional and international artists, spanning a wide range of musical genres. A list of notable concerts are given in the table below, with other non-concert entertainment events also included. 

All events are arranged in a chronological order.

1960s

1970s

1980s

1990s

2000s

2010s

Notes

References

Entertainment events at Civic Arena
Entertainment events in the United States
Lists of events by venue
Lists of events in the United States